Northern Transvaal were one of fourteen teams that competed in the 1997 Currie Cup competition. They won eight out of their thirteen matches and ended the season in fifth position on the log, failing to qualify for the semi-finals.

Log

Results

Notes

References

Northern Transvaal
1997